The High Road is the second studio album by American singer JoJo, released on October 17, 2006, by Da Family Entertainment, Blackground Records, and Universal Records. Recording sessions for the album took place between late 2005 and mid-2006 in California, New York City, Miami, and Atlanta. Several special editions of the album were marketed in different countries, ranging from five bonus tracks that were being used for different international countries’ version of the album or for specific physical outlets, with one of the tracks being “Leave (Get Out)”, her debut single from her first album. JoJo co-wrote two out of the 17 tracks from the album.

Recording sessions for the album began after JoJo completed filming Aquamarine, with over 30 songs being recorded for the album. While recording the album, JoJo worked with many producers, such as Scott Storch, Sean Garrett, Swizz Beatz, Josh Alexander, Billy Steinberg, Vincent Herbert, J.R. Rotem, Beau Dozier and Ryan Leslie as well as others, to handle production for the album. Amongst those included is a track titled "Anything", which heavily samples Toto's 1982 song "Africa". Lyrical themes involve relationships, young love, break-ups, forgiveness, self-acceptance, and faith. It features an eclectic array of styles, such as pop, alternative rock, and hip hop soul.

The High Road was promoted through various televised and festival appearances as an official tour never eventuated. The album was also preceded by the release of the lead single, a Billy Steinberg and Josh Alexander production called "Too Little Too Late", becoming JoJo's best-selling single to date on the Billboard Hot 100. It broke the record for the biggest jump into the top three on the Billboard Hot 100, moving from number 66 to number three in one week, while also reaching the top 10 in Australia, Ireland, New Zealand, and the UK. The second single, "How to Touch a Girl", was released on November 14, 2006, and failed to impact charts in the US. "Anything" was released as the album's third and final single on March 20, 2007, reaching number 18 in Ireland and number 21 in the UK.

Upon its release, the album received generally favorable reviews from music critics, many noting that the album showed more confidence while slower tracks helped showcase JoJo's "superb vocal abilities". The High Road debuted at number three on the Billboard 200 with 108,000 copies sold in its first week. It also peaked at number 12 on the Canadian Albums Chart and at number 24 on the UK Albums Chart. The album received gold certifications in the United States, Canada, and the United Kingdom, and as of December 2018, it had sold three million copies worldwide.

Re-recorded versions of JoJo and The High Road were released on December 21, 2018.

On August 5, 2021, Blackground Records announced on Twitter that the original versions of JoJo and The High Road would be available on streaming services on September 24, 2021.

Background
After the success of her debut album, JoJo quickly went back in the studio to work on new tracks. While recording, she worked with producers such as Josh Alexander, Beau Dozier, Ryan Leslie, J.R. Rotem, Matthew Gerrard, Soulshock & Karlin, Stargate, Billy Steinberg, Peter Stengaard, Scott Storch, Swizz Beatz, Justin Trugman, and Focus... It was reported that over 30 songs were written and recorded for the album, before being narrowed down to the twelve that made the final track listing. During an interview, JoJo compared The High Road to her previous album by stating, "I recorded my first album when I was 12, and now I'm 15. From age 12 to age 15 is a big jump in a young girl's life. I think with the new album, you can hear the maturity and confidence in my vocals. I'm coming into myself and being more comfortable. All of the songs on the album came out well - the music style is mostly urban like the my first album, but there are some rock elements too."

When asked about the recording process, JoJo stated, "I had finished promoting my first album, then I went to Australia to film Aquamarine", she recalled. "It was a busy time – while I was in Australia, I auditioned via satellite for RV. When I finished with Aquamarine, I came home and started working on the new album. It was mainly recorded in New York, Miami and L.A. We recorded over 30 songs with a lot of different people. [...] I feel that doing 30 songs was fine for the album. Some people would say that's too many to do, and it's costly to record that many songs. But Chris Brown recorded 50 songs for his album, and then he whittled it down and made a great record. When you record a lot of songs, you come up with different styles and ideas." On the album, JoJo got to work with Diane Warren, whom she had idolised. She recalled the process by saying, "I was very excited to get together with Diane Warren," she said. "I love Diane – she's one of my favorite people. We recorded four or five songs together, two of which made the album, 'Exceptional' and 'Note to God.' She's so cool."

Composition

The High Road contains a mixture of styles, ranging from R&B to pop. During an interview, JoJo stated, "I definitely felt more confident recording this album because I know how to go into the studio and how to work with producers. When you go into the studio you have to have a relationship with the producer while recording. Also, this time I knew how to warm up my vocals and what to expect." When asked about how the type of music she wanted on the album, she stated, "Well my executive Producer is Vincent Herbert and I've known him since I was twelve, actually since I was eleven, and he is very good at picking songs he thinks I'd like. He does like to throw curveballs sometimes and try different things. But most of the time we have the same taste."

The first song on the album is "This Time". The uptempo hip hop track has been called a personal favorite of JoJo's, with her performing it multiple times live. Lyrically, the song speaks of not letting someone she likes "get away" like she did with the last one. "The Way You Do Me" is the second song on the album, and was released as a promotional single for the album on September 20, 2006. Like the previous track, the song is very influenced by hip hop and R&B tracks. "Too Little Too Late" is the third song on the album, as well as the lead single. The song has become one of JoJo's biggest hits to date, reaching the Top 10 in the United States, Australia and the United Kingdom, among others. Lyrically, the song speaks of how JoJo cannot forgive her ex for what he has done to her. "The High Road", the album's title track, is the fourth song on the album. It is the first to contain spiritual references and is about seeking alternatives to revenge with lyrics like "Still I have faith/Somehow I believe/That if I keep love in my heart/It will find its way to me". The triple meter, mid-tempo song was influenced by old school jazz, soul music and gospel music. "Anything" is the fifth song on the album, as well as the third and final single. The uptempo track is heavily influenced by urban hip hop and R&B tracks, and lyrically speaks of JoJo falling in love with someone. "Like That", the sixth song on the album, is an R&B influenced mid-tempo track. The song features a piano throughout the song as well, and has been compared to releases by Ciara, among others.

The seventh track on the album, "Good Ol", is a mid-tempo hip hop track that sees JoJo singing about being free and having fun. "Coming for You" is a light rock song in the same vein as "Leave (Get Out)". It is her third song, including "Good Ol' and the aforementioned "Leave", to be produced by Soulshock & Karlin. The song has been called a female anthem, as JoJo is heard singing about not letting go of someone, and she is going to get them, and win their heart. The ninth song on the album is "Let It Rain". The mid-tempo R&B song was initially meant to be released as the third single from the album, however, its release was eventually canceled. It was released as a promotional single on September 20, along with two other songs from the album. "Exceptional" is the tenth song on the album, and is more slow-paced than the rest of the album. The song is designed to show off JoJo's vocals on the track. "How to Touch a Girl" is the 11th song on the album, as well as the album's second single. JoJo has called the song her favorite on the album. Lyrically, the song speaks of how to treat a woman, and how to touch her heart, according to JoJo. The final song, "Note to God", is the most religious on the album. The song was covered and released in 2010 by Jake Zyrus as his debut US single. The song had minor success on the Billboard Hot 100, peaking at number 44.

Release

Singles
"Too Little Too Late" was released on July 24, 2006, as the lead single from The High Road. The song broke the record for the biggest jump into the top three on the Billboard Hot 100 chart, moving from number 66 to number three in one week; this record was previously held by Mariah Carey with her 2001 single "Loverboy", which rose from number 60 to number two. However, the record was ultimately broken on the issue dated February 7, 2009 by Kelly Clarkson's "My Life Would Suck Without You", which jumped from number 97 to number one. In the United Kingdom, the single entered the UK Singles Chart at number 22 based on downloads alone two weeks before its physical CD release. This is because from 2007, the United Kingdom changed charting rules and downloaded singles can enter the UK Singles Chart at any time. When the song was released to physical CD, it went up the chart to number four, its peak position. This made it JoJo's second top-five and third top-10 single in the United Kingdom. The song also reached number one on the UK iTunes Top 100 Songs on January 10. With "Too Little Too Late" having spent six weeks in the top 10, and 11 weeks in the top 40, it has been named her most successful single in the United Kingdom, although "Leave (Get Out)" peaked at number two. The song also managed to stay in the top 75 until late April.

On September 20, 2006, three promotional singles were released to iTunes to help promote the release of the album. "This Time", "The Way You Do Me", and "Let It Rain". The songs have all been performed live at several venues. The second official single, "How to Touch a Girl", was released on November 14, 2006. The song was well received by critics. Chuck Taylor of Billboard said that "'How to Touch a Girl' again casts the youngster with a crafty melody, albeit strikingly similar in structure to the previous hit. Despite the bizarre, almost perverse title, this track could propel the burgeoning talent all the way." In a review of The High Road, Bill Lamb called the song "a near perfect piece of teen pop." Despite the strong critical reception, the song failed to have any chart success. In the United States, the single failed to chart on the Billboard Hot 100, and only reached number 76 on the Pop 100. Due to its failure in the United States, the single was not released anywhere else. Initially, "Let It Rain" was meant to be the album's third single, however, due to lack of fan approval, the single was scrapped. "Anything" was then released as the album's third and final single on March 20, 2007. The single was the second official single from The High Road in European countries and was released in the United Kingdom on May 7, 2007; it began gaining airplay there on March 24, 2007, eventually debuting on BBC Radio 1's playlist under the B-list section. JoJo was in the United Kingdom during the first two weeks of May to promote the single; she performed at London's G-A-Y on May 12, and appeared on GMTV on May 8 as part of a series of radio and television interviews. "Anything" remained in the top 40 of the UK Singles Chart for three weeks.

Promotion
On September 20, 2006, fans were able to buy from the iTunes Store snippets of three of JoJo's songs from the album, including "The Way You Do Me", "Let It Rain" and "This Time". The three promotional singles were released to raise hype for the album, after the success of the lead single. On September 27, JoJo performed "Too Little Too Late" and "This Time" on MTV's TRL. On September 28, AOL released Sessions@AOL, an exclusive performance from JoJo. During the performance, she performed the singles "Too Little Too Late" and "How to Touch a Girl", as well as two of JoJo's personal favorites, "This Time" and "The Way You Do Me", which had both been released as promotional singles before the album's release.

Though there has not been an official tour, she has been performing with a live band as part of the Six Flags Starburst Thursday Night Concert series during the summer of 2007. During some of these shows she has included medleys of her favorite popular songs from Beyoncé ("Déjà Vu"), Kelly Clarkson ("Since U Been Gone"), SWV, Gnarls Barkley, Jackson 5, Justin Timberlake ("My Love"), Maroon 5 ("Makes Me Wonder"), Usher, Carlos Santana, Jill Scott, Michael Jackson, George Benson, Musiq Soulchild, and Amy Winehouse ("Rehab", replacing the title with "Boston"). In November 2007, JoJo she toured in Brasil at the Live Pop Rock Brasil.

Critical reception

The album received generally positive reviews from music critics. Alex Macpherson of The Guardian gave the album a positive 4/5 stars stated that, "Hotshot R&B producers have been roped in: Swizz Beatz' fiery The Way You Do Me, which continues in the vein of his sterling work on the more red-blooded moments of Beyoncé's latest album, is a particular highlight, with JoJo herself proving surprisingly adept at frenzied, sexually possessed hollering. At heart, though, she's an earnest sort of girl, most evident on the supremely melodramatic Note to God, a Diane Warren-penned state-of-the-nation ballad that starts off with JoJo emoting over a solo Wurlitzer and inevitably ends up caught in a storm of crashing chorales. JoJo is, however, at her best when compulsively dissecting emotional situations straight out of high-school movies via the medium of big, heartfelt choruses: the country-tinged Good Ol' is gently, dreamily optimistic, and the wonderfully weepy pinnacle comes with the bleak resignation of Too Little Too Late." Matt Collar of AllMusic gave the album a positive 4/5 stars stated that, "These are well-written, catchy pop songs with a healthy dose of hip-hop rhythm that serve as solid launching pads for Jojo's superb vocal abilities. It also helps that she's matured just enough so that her somewhat sexy persona makes a bit more sense now than it did in 2004, and she easily sells the cheeky and raw dance-funk of such tracks as "This Time" and "The Way You Do Me." However, it's the blissfully melodic ballads and mid-tempo anthems that make the biggest impression here. Cuts such as the gorgeous and dreamy "Like That" and "Anything," with its unexpectedly hip sampling of Toto's "Africa," make for gleefully enjoyable guilty pleasures. Similarly, "Good Ol'" is the best summer anthem ever to see release in the fall, and "'Comin' for You" smartly borrows some of Kelly Clarkson's rock energy. While Jojo may not be taking a career road less traveled, The High Road does make time for some surprising and memorable pit stops along the way."

In a mixed review, Kelefa Sanneh of The New York Times felt that "[n]othing else on The High Road [...] is as great as ['Too Little Too Late']", adding that "JoJo is a teen-pop star with an R&B singer's voice: that means she can outsing much of the competition, but it also means more ballads (the album's second half is infested with them) and more not-quite-credible lovesick lyrics. Still, she knows exactly what to do with a good beat. In 'The Way You Do Me,' she sounds as hyped-up as Swizz Beatz's track. And in 'Anything,' she sings a lovely little song over a sample of the 1982 Toto hit 'Africa.' That's classic rock, if you're a singer of a certain age."

Commercial performance
The High Road debuted at number three on the US Billboard 200, selling 108,000 copies in its first week. Nearly a month after its release in the United States, on November 28, 2006, the album was certified gold by the Recording Industry Association of America (RIAA), and had sold 538,000 copies in the United States by March 2007. The album debuted at number 12 on the Canadian Albums Chart, becoming JoJo's first album to enter the top 20 in that country. It was certified gold by the Canadian Recording Industry Association (CRIA) on January 17, 2007, denoting shipments in excess of 50,000 units.

In the United Kingdom, The High Road debuted at number 59 on the UK Albums Chart, peaking at number 24 in its third week on the chart. On June 8, 2007, the British Phonographic Industry (BPI) certified it gold for shipping over 100,000 copies. Elsewhere, the album reached number 45 in Japan, number 94 in Belgium and number 96 in Switzerland. As of August 2015, The High Road had sold three million copies worldwide.

Track listing

Notes
  signifies a co-producer
  signifies a vocal producer

Sample credits
 "Anything" contains a sample of "Africa" by Toto.

Personnel
Credits adapted from the liner notes of The High Road.

Musicians

 JoJo – vocal arrangement, lead vocals, background vocals
 J.R. Rotem – music, music arrangement 
 Matthew Gerrard – additional strings, additional horns, additional percussion, vocal arrangement 
 Bridget Benenate – vocal arrangement 
 Ryan Leslie – vocal arrangement, all instruments, programming 
 Corey Williams – vocal arrangement 
 Soulshock and Karlin – arrangement ; all instruments 
 Mikkel S. Eriksen – all instruments 
 Tor Erik Hermansen – all instruments 
 Makeba Riddick – background vocals

Technical

 Scott Storch – production 
 Sean Garrett – co-production 
 Wayne "The Brain" Allison – recording 
 Paul Foley – recording ; vocal recording ; Pro Tools engineering 
 Vadim "Chiss" Chislov – recording assistance 
 Mark "Exit" Goodchild – vocal recording 
 Phil Tan – mixing 
 Josh Houghkirk – engineering assistance 
 Swizz Beatz – production 
 Eric "Erk" Vargas – recording 
 Rich Keller – mixing 
 Josh Alexander – production, recording 
 Vincent Herbert – production ; vocal production ; executive production
 Billy Steinberg – production 
 Dave Russell – mixing ; recording ; vocal recording 
 Katia Lewin – engineering assistance 
 Jonathan "J.R." Rotem – production 
 Matthew Gerrard – production 
 Jay Goin – engineering assistance 
 Matty Green – engineering assistance 
 Beau Dozier – production, recording 
 Justin Trugman – production 
 Michael Woodrum – Pro Tools engineering 
 Scott Somerville – engineering assistance 
 Ryan Leslie – production, recording 
 Soulshock and Karlin – production 
 Soulshock – mixing 
 Stargate – production 
 Makeba Riddick – vocal production 
 Mikkel S. Eriksen – recording 
 Peter Stengaard – production 
 Alan Mason – engineering assistance 
 Rob Arbittier – vocal recording 
 Gene Grimaldi – mastering
 Katie Gallagher – product management
 Genevieve Zaragoza – production coordination
 Jomo Hankerson – executive production
 Barry Hankerson – executive production

Artwork
 Heather Wesley – creative direction
 Stacey "Swade" Wade – art direction
 George Holz – photography

Charts

Weekly charts

Year-end charts

Certifications

Release history

The High Road (2018)

On December 20, 2018, JoJo re-recorded The High Road along with her self-titled debut album and singles "Demonstrate" and "Disaster", released under JoJo's new label imprint Clover Music on December 21. The decision to re-record the singles and albums came from the removal of all of JoJo's original music released under Blackground Records from all streaming and digital selling platforms.

Blackground owns the master licensing to the original recordings and has control over their release. JoJo sought after getting the original songs and albums back online, but would never come to an agreement with the label. JoJo's lawyer stated they had reached the end of the statute of limitations on the re-record clause which gave her the rights to "cover" her own music.

Despite the releases of the original versions of JoJo and The High Road on digital and streaming platforms in 2021, JoJo stated that she does not benefit financially from the releases, and encourages fans to support the re-recorded versions instead.

Track listing
All tracks are noted as "2018".

Notes

References

2006 albums
Albums produced by Billy Steinberg
Albums produced by J. R. Rotem
Albums produced by Matthew Gerrard
Albums produced by Ryan Leslie
Albums produced by Scott Storch
Albums produced by Soulshock and Karlin
Albums produced by Stargate
Albums produced by Swizz Beatz
JoJo (singer) albums
Universal Records albums